The Exagon Furtive-eGT is a four-seat electric grand tourer sports car produced by Exagon Motors. It was unveiled at the 2010 Paris Motor Show as a concept. A slightly amended pre-production version was launched at the Geneva Motor Show in March 2013.

This allows it to accelerate from 0 to 100 km/h (62 mph) in 3.5 seconds.
The lithium-ion battery has 53 kWh capacity providing a claimed range of 360 kilometers (223 miles) in the city, without memory effect and highly recyclable and a minimum capacity after 3,000 cycles (approximately 10 years of use) of over 80%.

Exagon says it used Formula One technology to develop the chassis, which consists of a carbon fiber/honeycomb structure monocoque to which cast aluminium subframes are attached. The body of the Furtive-eGT is also made from advanced composite materials and weighs .

References

External links
 
 Exagon's 155 mph Furtive-eGT electric supercar

Electric concept cars
Electric sports cars
2010s cars